Brad Kearns (born February 4, 1965 in Los Angeles, California) is an American author, podcast host, professional speed golfer, masters high jumper, and former professional triathlete. Kearns performed on the international triathlon circuit from 1986 to 1995 and won 31 events worldwide. He is currently a top-20 world-ranked professional speed golfer, and 2020 top-3 world-ranked masters age 55-59 high jumper. In 2018, Kearns broke the Guinness world record for the fastest single hole of golf ever played (minimum length, 500 yards).

Athletic career

Kearns' start in endurance sports was at Taft High School in Woodland Hills, California, where he ran cross country and track from 1980 to 1982. He was 17th in the 1981 National Junior Olympics Cross Country meet at age 15, and a finalist at the National Junior Olympics Track & Field Championships 1500 meters at age 16, winning his semi-final heat in 4:06, and achieving a national ranking of 12th in his age division. He placed 5th in the Los Angeles City Cross Country Championships in 1981, setting a school record of 15:24 on the Pierce College course that held for nearly 20 years, and still ranks in the top 60 all-time LA City section performances as of 2015. In track and field, he set a Los Angeles City Cee Division (i.e. - Frosh/Soph) record, winning the 1600 meter title in 1981 in 4.26.05. As a senior in 1982, Kearns placed 4th in the Los Angeles City section 1600 meters in 4:23, coming from 50 meters behind the pack on the final lap to take the final qualifying spot for the California state high school championships. At the state meet at Hughes Stadium in Sacramento, Kearns was seeded 24th out of 27th qualifiers, but was a surprise qualifier for the finals. He set a personal record of 4:19.30 to place fifth in his qualifying heat, again passing several runners with a final lap split of 59 seconds. He placed 9th in the state final 1600 meter race in a time of 4:20.

Kearns graduated from UC Santa Barbara with a B.A., cum laude, in business/economics in 1985. In 1982, as a freshman on the varsity cross country team, he placed 37th in the Pacific Coast Athletic Association cross country championships at Woodward Park in Fresno. The meet was held in conjunction with the Pac-10 cross country championships, and Kearns placed 93rd overall in the 10k race in a time of 32:44. His running career at UCSB was riddled with injuries and illness, leading him to embark on triathlon efforts. In his first year of cycling on the UCSB club team, Kearns was California Collegiate Cycling Association state champion in the Novice B division in the 10-mile time trial with a time of 24:27.

After an 11-week stint at the KPMG accounting firm in downtown Los Angeles, Kearns decided to pursue a career on the professional triathlon circuit. Over nine years on the professional circuit, career highlights include wins at the 1991 National Bud Light USTS Series/Coke Grand Prix Championship, the 1991 USA Triathlon National Sprint Championship, the 1991 International Triathlon Union Pan-American Championship, a streak of seven consecutive wins in 1991-1992 and a year-end #3 world-ranking in 1991.

 
In November, 1986, as an unranked rookie professional, Kearns upset world's #1 duathlete Kenny Souza and world #1 ranked triathlete Scott Molina at the inaugural Desert Princess World Championship Series Run-Bike-Run event (10k-62k-10k), with a time of 2:44. Six weeks later, under pressure to legitimize his fluke victory against the two world leaders and many other top professionals from both the duathlon and triathlon circuits, Kearns shattered the course record and beat his nearest competitor by five minutes, in a time of 2:38:47. At the final race in the series in February, 1987, Kearns placed 4th to easily claim the first Duathlon World Championship Series title. At this event he became the first athlete in history to use aerodynamic handlebars in a multisport event, debuting a handcrafted Scott DH handlebar from inventor Boone Lennon. In moving from 27th place to 4th place during the 62k bike segment, many competitors were availed a glimpse at the aerodynamic advantage provided by the DH bars, and they soon became popular on the circuit.

Over the seasons of 1990 and 1991, Kearns had 15 first-place finishes at major races and 33 top-5 finishes. In world championship competition, he placed 5th at the long course championships in Nice, France (1988), 6th at the Olympic distance world championship in Kelowna, B.C. (1988) and 5th at the ITU Olympic distance world championships in Muskoka, Ontario (1992). Over the ensuing 28 years, Kearns has been the last USA athlete to place top-5 at ITU Olympic distance worlds. In 1991, Kearns won the ITU World Cup/Pan American Championship event at Olympic distance (1.5k-40k-10k) in Ixtapa, Mexico by a record margin of five minutes. In 1993, Kearns won the richest sprint distance triathlon in the history of triathlon, the DCA Atlanta event (1k-20k-5k), earning $11,750 in the 51-minute race.

Later athletic career

Kearns' current competitive focus is the unique sport of Speedgolf, and he is a four-time top-20 finisher in the World Professional Speedgolf Championships. In Speedgolf tournaments, competitors run through the round at high speed, carrying only a handful of clubs. Both minutes and strokes are added together to achieve a Speedgolf total score. Kearns was a professional competitor in the late 1990s, placing 8th in the 1996 World "Extreme Golf" Championships in San Diego. In 2014, he returned to professional competition for the first time in 18 years. He placed 20th in the 2014 World Speedgolf Championships at Bandon Dunes, Oregon, shooting 83 in 51 minutes for a Speedgolf score of 134.12. In 2015, Kearns repeated his 20th-place finish in the professional division of the World Speedgolf Championships on Oct 19-20 at the Glen Club in Chicago, IL. His 36-hole score was 289. In 2016, Kearns placed 19th in the professional division of the World Speedgolf Championships on Oct 17-18 at the Glen Club in Chicago, IL.

In 2018, Kearns twice broke the Guinness World Record for the fastest single hole of golf ever played by an individual (minimum hole length of 500 yards.) On May 8, 2018, at the Bing Maloney Golf Course in Sacramento, CA, Kearns played the 503-yard ninth hole in one minute, 40.24 seconds, taking ten seconds off of the previous record held by Steve Jeffs of England. On June 1, 2018, at the Woodley Lakes Golf Course in Van Nuys, CA, Kearns played the 503-yard fourth hole in one minute, 38.75 seconds. Using only a single club, a 3-wood, Kearns scored a birdie four on the par-5 hole, sprinting full speed between shots.

 
Kearns is also an avid high jumper and sprinter. In February 2020, competing in the high jump in the masters age 55-59 division in Santa Monica, CA, he cleared 5'0" (1.52m), which ranked him #1 in the USA and #3 in the world as of May, 2020. In 2016 at age 51, Kearns cleared 1.65m (5'5"), in the high jump at a practice session, matching the All-American standard for the 50-54 age group. At Placer High School track practice, Kearns clocked times of 13.0 for 100 meters and 59.6 for 400 meters at age 48. At age 49, he delivered a 59.6 in the 400 meters. Kearns ran in the 50s at age 50 with another 400 meter time trial.

Publishing and coaching
Kearns has self-published several books and written three published by McGraw-Hill: Breakthrough Triathlon Training (2005) , How Lance Does It (2006) , and How Tiger Does It . Kearns created and produced the Auburn Triathlon in Auburn, for 11 years. He was the founder and executive director of a kids fitness program called Running School, delivering fitness and healthy lifestyle programming to students at partner elementary schools in Northern California and Nevada.

Since 2008, Kearns has worked with Mark Sisson to create the Primal Blueprint books and evolutionary-based diet, exercise and lifestyle movement. In 2012, Kearns did a 22-city tour across America deliver the Primal Blueprint Transformation Seminar. From 2010-2014, Kearns was the director of 9 PrimalCon healthy lifestyle retreats in cities across North America. He and Sisson co-authored the book Primal Endurance in 2016, The Keto Reset Diet in 2017, Keto For Life in 2020, and Two Meals A Day in 2021. The Keto Reset Diet became a New York Times bestseller in October 2017, reached #4 in its non-fiction category, and briefly ranked as the #1 bestselling book overall on amazon.com.

Kearns hosts the B.rad Podcast, covering health, fitness, peak performance, happiness, and longevity, with an emphasis on toning down the overly intense and self-important competitive disposition in favor of cultivating a pure motivation and releasing the attachment of self-esteem to the outcome of your peak performance pursuits. He has interviewed numerous high profile guests, including: NY Times bestselling authors Mark Manson (The Subtle Art of Not Giving a Fuck), John Gray (Men Are from Mars, Women Are from Venus), Melissa Urban (Whole30), Gretchen Rubin (The 4 Tendencies) Seth Godin (This Is Marketing), Dan Millman (The Way Of The Peaceful Warrior), and John Assaraf (The Answer); top podcasters Ben Greenfield, Abel James, Drew Manning, and Luke Storey; ancestral health leaders Mark Sisson, Dr. Peter Attia, Dr. Cate Shanahan, Robb Wolf, Dr. Shawn Baker, and Dr. Paul Saladino; fitness icons Laird Hamilton, Gabby Reece, Dr. Kelly Starrett, Dr. Phil Maffetone, and Brian MacKenzie; triathlon legends Mark Allen and Dave Scott; Olympic 800-meter runner Nick Symmonds; and Time magazine 2017 Co-Person of the Year Dr. Wendy Walsh.

References

External links 
 
2014 World Speedgolf Championships
 http://mastersrankings.com/

1965 births
Living people
American podcasters
American male triathletes
Track and field athletes from Los Angeles
William Howard Taft Charter High School alumni
UC Santa Barbara Gauchos men's track and field athletes
Golfers from Los Angeles